General Sir Edward Stanton  (19 February 1827 – 24 June 1907) was a British Army officer and diplomat.

Early life
Edward Stanton was born in Painswick, Gloucestershire, the son of William Henry Stanton, of Stroud, Gloucestershire, and his wife, Jane. He was educated at Woolwich Academy.

Career
Stanton was commissioned as second lieutenant in the Royal Engineers on 19 December 1844. He served in the Crimean War. From 1856 to 1857, he served on the boundary commission that determined the Russo-Turkish borders.

He was appointed Consul-General in Warsaw, Poland on 7 December 1860, Agent and Consul-General in Egypt on 15 May 1865, and Chargé d'Affaires to the King of Bavaria on 10 May 1876. During his visit to Egypt, English author and poet Edward Lear described Sir Edward Stanton as "very good-natured". Sir Edward Stanton retired as a general in 1881.

Family
In 1862, Edward Stanton married Margarette Constance Starkey. He was a relative on her mother's side of the family. His son Colonel Edward Alexander Stanton (1867–1947) served in Egypt at Omdurman, was Governor of Khartoum from 1900 to 1908, and military governor of Haifa (the Phoenicia Division of Palestine) from 1918 to 1920.

Honours
Stanton was appointed a Companion of the Order of the Bath (CB) in 1857 and upgraded to a Knight Commander of the order (KCB) in 1905. He was knighted as a Knight Commander of the Order of St Michael and St George (KCMG) in 1882.

In addition to his British honours, Sir Edward Stanton was a Knight of the French Legion of Honour.

References

1827 births
1907 deaths
British Army generals
British Army personnel of the Crimean War
British consuls-general in Egypt
Chevaliers of the Légion d'honneur
Knights Commander of the Order of St Michael and St George
Knights Commander of the Order of the Bath
Royal Engineers officers
Graduates of the Royal Military Academy, Woolwich